Iron Man is a comic book superhero in the . Since 1963, he has starred in several ongoing series, as well as a large number of limited series and specials. All stories are published exclusively by Marvel Comics under their standard imprint, unless otherwise noted.

Primary series
Tales of Suspense #39-99 (March 1963 – March 1968)
Iron Man #1-332 (May 1968 - September 1996)
Iron Man Annual #1-15 (1970-1971; 1976-1977; 1982-1984; 1986-1987; 1989-1994)
Iron Man vol. 2 #1-13 [#333-345] (November 1996 - November 1997)
Iron Man vol. 3 #1-89 [#346-434] (February 1998 - December 2004)
Captain America/Iron Man Annual #1998
Iron Man Annual #1999-2001 (1999-2001)
Iron Man vol. 4 #1-35 [#435-469] (January 2005 - January 2009)
Iron Man Director of S.H.I.E.L.D. Annual (November 2007)
The Invincible Iron Man #1-33 [#470-502], #500-527 [#503-530] (July 2008 - February 2011; March 2011 - December 2012), #500.1
The Invincible Iron Man Annual (August 2010)
Iron Man vol. 5 #1-28 [#531-558] (January 2013 - August 2014), #20.INH
Iron Man Annual #1 (April 2014), Iron Man Special #1 (September 2014)
Superior Iron Man #1-9 [#559-567] (January 2015 - August 2015)
Invincible Iron Man vol. 2 #1-14 [#568-581] (December 2015 - December 2016)
Invincible Iron Man vol. 3 #1-11 [#582-592] (January 2017 - November 2017), #593-600 (December 2017 - July 2018)
Tony Stark: Iron Man #1-19 [#601-619] (August 2018 - February 2020)
Iron Man 2020 vol. 2 #1-6 [#620-626] (March 2020 - October 2020)
Iron Man vol. 6, #1-25 [#626-650] (November 2020 – December 2022)
Invincible Iron Man vol. 4 #1-present [#651-present] (January 2023-present)

Timeline

Spin-off series
War Machine #1-25 (April 1994 - April 1996)
U.S. War Machine #1-12 (Marvel MAX; November 2001 - January 2002)
U.S. War Machine 2.0 #1-3 (Marvel MAX; September 2003)
War Machine vol. 2, #1-12 (February 2009 - February 2010)
Iron Man: Legacy #1-11 (June 2010 - April 2011)
Iron Man 2.0 #1-12 (April 2011 - February 2012)
Iron Patriot #1-5 (March 2014 - July 2014)
International Iron Man #1-7 (May 2016 - November 2016)
Infamous Iron Man #1-12 (December 2016 - November 2017)

Limited series and one-shots
Iron Man and Sub-Mariner (April 1968)
Giant-Size Iron Man (October 1975)
Iron Man: Crash (Graphic Novel) (September 1988)
Iron Manual (1993)
Iron Man: The Legend (September 1996)
Iron Man: The Iron Age #1-2 (August–September 1998)
Iron Man Bad Blood #1-4 (September–December 2000)
Ultimate Iron Man #1-5 (March 2005 - February 2006)
Iron Man: House of M #1-3 (September–November 2005)
Iron Man: The Inevitable #1-6 (February–July 2006)
Iron Man: Hypervelocity #1-6 (March–August 2007)
Iron Man: Enter the Mandarin #1-6 (November 2007 - May 2008)
Ultimate Human #1-4 (January–April 2008)
Ultimate Iron Man II #1-5 (February–July 2008)
Iron Man: Legacy of Doom #1-4 (June–September 2008)
Iron Man: Viva Las Vegas #1-2 (July–September 2008)
Ultimate Comics: Armor Wars #1-4 (November 2009 - April 2010)
Iron Man vs. Whiplash #1-4 (January–April 2010)
Iron Man Noir #1-4 (June–September 2010)
Rescue (July 2010)
Iron Man Titanium (December 2010)
Iron Man: The Rapture #1-4 (January–April 2011)
Ultimate Comics: Iron Man #1-4 (December 2012 - February 2013)

Writers
 Stan Lee Tales of Suspense #39-98 (Iron Man Stories)
 Larry Lieber Tales of Suspense #39, 41-45, 47-51, 53, 58
 Archie Goodwin #1-28, 76, 88-90, Iron Man and Sub-Mariner #1, 
 Mimi Gold #29
 Allyn Brodsky #30-34, 38
 Gerry Conway #35-43, 91-97
 Robert Kanigher #44
 Roy Thomas #44, 47, Annual #11
 Gary Friedrich #45-46, 60, 70
 Mike Friedrich #48-55, 58-59, 61-69, 71-75, 77-81
 Jim Starlin #55
 Steve Gerber #56-58
 Len Wein #82-85
 Roger Slifer #84-85
 Bill Mantlo #78, 86-87, 95-115, Annual #4
 Peter Gillis Annual #5-6 
 Ralph Macchio Annual #5
 Bob Harras Annual #7-8
 Evan Skolnick, Carrie Barre, & Rob Tokar Annual #11
 David Michelinie #116-157, 215-250, Annual #9-10
 Bob Layton #116-117, 119-120, 123, 125, 127-133, 135, 137-153, 215-250, 254, 256, Annual #9  
 Alan Kupperberg #157
 Denny O'Neil #158, 160-208
 Roger McKenzie #159
 Dennis Mallonee #209
 Danny Fingeroth #202, 210, 212-214, 253
 Howard Mackie #211
 Dwayne McDuffie #251-252, Annual #11
 Glenn Herdling #255
 Fabian Nicieza #255
 Randall Frenz #257
 John Byrne #258-277
 Len Kaminski #278-318, Annual #12-15
 Terry Kavanagh #319-332
 Scott Lobdell Vol. 2 #1-7
 Jim Lee Vol. 2 #1-5, 7, 11-12
 Jeph Loeb Vol. 2 #7-12
 James Robinson Vol. 2 #13
 Kurt Busiek Vol. 3 #1-25, Iron Man & Captain America Annual 1998, Annual 1999
 Joe Casey Annual 1999
 Joe Quesada Vol. 3 #26-35, Annual 2000
 Chuck Dixon Vol. 3 #36
 Frank Tieri Vol. 3 #37-49, Annual 2001
 Mike Grell Vol. 3 #50-66
 Robin Laws Vol. 3 #65-72
 John Jackson Miller Vol. 3 #73-85
 Mark Ricketts Vol. 3 #86-86
 Warren Ellis Vol. 4 #1-6
 Daniel Knauf Vol. 4 #7-15, 21-28
 Charles Knauf Vol. 4 #7-18
 Christos N. Gage Vol. 4 #19-20, 33-35, Director S.H.I.E.L.D. Annual #1
 Stuart Moore Vol. 4 #29-32
 Matt Fraction Invincible Iron Man Vol. 1 #1-33, 500-527, 500.1, Annual #1
 Kieron Gillen Vol. 5 #1-28, Annual #1
 Tom Taylor Superior Iron Man #1-9
 Brian Michael Bendis Invincible Iron Man Vol. 2 #1-14, Vol. 3 #1-13, #593-600
 Dan Slott Tony Stark, Iron Man #1-19, Iron Man 2020 #1-6
 Christopher Cantwell Vol. 6 #1-24
 Gerry Duggan Invincible Iron Man vol. 4 #1-present

Collected editions

Marvel Masterworks: Iron Man

Essential Iron Man

Iron Man Epic Collection

Iron Man Omnibus

Iron Man

Heroes Reborn/Return Era

Iron Man (vol. 4), Invincible Iron Man (vol. 1)

Iron Man (vol. 5)

Bendis Era

Tony Stark: Iron Man

Iron Man (vol. 6)

Miniseries and Miscellaneous

References

Lists of comic book titles
Lists of comics by character
Lists of comics by Marvel Comics
Iron Man titles